Mansour Abdulrahim Al-Saleem (born 16 March 1988) is a Saudi Arabian weightlifter.

He won a medal at the 2019 World Weightlifting Championships.

He won the bronze medal in the men's 55kg event at the 2022 Asian Weightlifting Championships held in Manama, Bahrain.

References

External links

1988 births
Living people
Saudi Arabian male weightlifters
World Weightlifting Championships medalists
Weightlifters at the 2010 Asian Games
Weightlifters at the 2014 Asian Games
Weightlifters at the 2018 Asian Games
Asian Games competitors for Saudi Arabia
Islamic Solidarity Games competitors for Saudi Arabia
Islamic Solidarity Games medalists in weightlifting
21st-century Saudi Arabian people